El cantor del pueblo (English: The town's singer) is a 1948 Argentine musical film, directed by Antonio Ber Ciani and written by Carlos Goicoechea and Rogelio cordone. It was premiered on January 23, 1948.

The film is about a trio of tango singers that are dreaming to be famous.

Cast
  Roberto Quiroga
  Tito Lusiardo
  Mario Fortuna
  Perla Mux
  Herminia Franco
  César Fiaschi
  María Esther Podestá
  Mabel Dorán
  Oscar Soldati
  Lilian Valmar
  Narciso Ibáñez
  Hernani Stinga
  María Esther Buschiazzo
  Domingo Mania
  Juan D'Arienzo
  Alfredo de Angelis
  Roberto Firpo
  Domingo Federico

External links

1948 films
1940s Spanish-language films
Argentine black-and-white films
Films directed by Antonio Ber Ciani
Argentine musical films
1948 musical films
1940s Argentine films